Strasburg Presbyterian Church is a historic Presbyterian church in Strasburg, Virginia, US.

Location
The building is located at 325 South Holliday Street.

History
The church was built in 1830. It is the oldest church in Shenandoah County. It is also the oldest building still standing in Strasburg. Its first pastor was Reverend William Henry Foote.

During the American Civil War of 1861–1865, the building was used as a hospital for the Confederate States Army and the Union forces. There is an adjacent cemetery which contains Confederate soldier graves.

A school building was added to the church in 1926.

The church building survived a fire in 2011.

References

External links
 
 

Presbyterian churches in Virginia
Buildings and structures in Shenandoah County, Virginia
Churches completed in 1830
Military history of the Confederate States of America
Confederate States of America cemeteries
1830 establishments in Virginia